Water, Water Every Hare is a 1952 Warner Bros. Looney Tunes cartoon directed by Chuck Jones. The cartoon was released on April 19, 1952 and stars Bugs Bunny. The short is a return to the themes of the 1946 cartoon Hair-Raising Hare and brings the monster Gossamer back to the screen.

The title is a pun on the line "Water, water, everywhere / Nor any drop to drink" from the poem The Rime of the Ancient Mariner, by Samuel Taylor Coleridge. The cartoon is available on Disc 1 of the Looney Tunes Golden Collection: Volume 1.

Plot
Much like in Hair-Raising Hare, Bugs (after being flooded out of his rabbit hole while sleeping during a heavy rain) finds himself trapped in the castle of an "evil scientist" (the neon sign outside his castle says so, punctuated with a second flashing line, "BOO"), a caricature of Boris Karloff, and needs a living brain to complete an experiment, shown to be a giant robot (Bugs' brain is declared to be "A wee bit small, but it will have to do."). When Bugs awakens, he is terrified when he sees a mummy, the scientist ("Eh, eh, eh, w-w-what's up, doc?"), a sarcophagus ("What's going on around here?") and the robot ("Where am I anyway?"), eventually running away after the terror of seeing all three. The scientist sends out an orange, hairy monster he calls "Rudolph" to retrieve him, with the promise of being rewarded with a spider goulash.

In a scene very similar to the one in Hair-Raising Hare, Bugs keeps running until a trap door on the floor opens and a rock falls into a water pit, where there are crocodiles swimming around and snapping their jaws in the air. While he is walking backwards and praying, thankful he did not fall, he bumps into the monster. Bugs comes up with an idea ("Uh oh. Think fast, rabbit!") and makes as a gabby hairdresser, giving the hairy monster a new hairdo ("My stars! Where did you ever get that awful hairdo? It doesn't become you at all. Here, for goodness' sake, let me fix it up. Look how stringy and messy it is. What a shame! Such an interesting monster, too. My stars, if an interesting monster can't have an interesting hairdo, then I don't know what things are coming to. In my business, you meet so many interesting people. Bobby pins, please. But the most interesting ones are the monsters. Oh, dear, that'll never stay. We'll just have to have a permanent.") He gets some dynamite sticks and places them in the monster's hair, which give the appearance of curlers. He lights them and runs off ("Now, I've got to give an interesting old lady a manicure; but I'll be back before you're done.") just before the explosion, which leaves the monster with a bald head.

The monster, after tying his hair over the spot, goes after Bugs. In the chemical room, Bugs sees a bottle of "vanishing fluid" and pours it all over himself, becoming invisible ("Hmm,... Not bad."). As the monster looks around for Bugs in the chemical room, Bugs gets a trash can and dumps it on the monster. Then he gets a mallet and hits the trash can, causing it to shake, then pulls out the rug the monster is standing on from underneath his feet, causing him to fall on his bottom when he takes the trash can off and looks around. For the coup de grâce, Bugs takes a bottle of "reducing oil" and pours the entire contents over the monster, shrinking him as he lets out a roar. Putting on a suit, coat and hat and grabbing two suitcases, the monster enters a mouse hole, kicks its resident out and slams the door, which bears a sign saying "I QUIT!", much to the agreement of the mouse, who, while holding up a bottle of whiskey ("xxx"), says "I quit too.", then dashes away.

Bugs, still invisible, eats a carrot in satisfaction of getting rid of the monster ("Well, that's that."). Suddenly, the mad scientist makes him visible with "hare restorer" ("Never send a monster to do the work of an evil scientist."), insisting the rabbit hand over his brain ("Now be a cooperative little bunny and let me have your brain."). When Bugs refuses ("Uh, sorry doc, but I need what little I've got."), the scientist throws a hatchet straight at him. Bugs ducks and the axe smashes open a large bottle of ether, resulting in the fumes drugging both Bugs and the scientist. In slow motion, the groggy scientist chases after an equally groggy Bugs while issuing demands ("Come...back...here...you...rab...bit!") (Carl Stalling cleverly punctuates the chase by playing a slow, "drowsy" version of the William Tell Overture). Bugs slowly trips the scientist, who while slowly floating to the floor falls asleep saying "Nighty-night.".

Still slowly, Bugs runs out of the castle and across the horizon, trips over a rock and, just like the scientist falls asleep, saying "Nighty-night", landing in a stream which leads Bugs straight back into his flooded hole. Suddenly waking up, he  declares that it must have been a nightmare. The miniature monster passes by on a rowboat and tells him in a high-pitched voice, "Oh yeah!? That's what you think!", leaving Bugs with a confused look on his face.

Cast
Mel Blanc as Bugs Bunny, Gossamer ("Rudolph") and Mouse
John T. Smith as Scientist (uncredited)

See also
 Looney Tunes and Merrie Melodies filmography (1950–1959)
 Hair-Raising Hare
 List of Bugs Bunny cartoons

References

External links

 
 Water, Water Every Hare on the Internet Archive

1952 films
1952 animated films
1952 short films
1950s Warner Bros. animated short films
Looney Tunes shorts
Short films directed by Chuck Jones
Mad scientist films
1950s monster movies
Films scored by Carl Stalling
American monster movies
Bugs Bunny films
Films about invisibility
Films with screenplays by Michael Maltese
Films set in castles
1950s English-language films
Boris Karloff